Yoloxóchitl Mixtec is a Mixtec language of Guerrero. It is not close to other varieties of Mixtec.

Resources 
 Yoloxóchitl Mixtec Language Documentation Project of Jonathan Amith and Rey Castillo - Archive of audio recordings and text transcriptions of Yoloxóchitl Mixtec from native speakers from the Archive of the Indigenous Language of Latin America.

References 

Mixtec language